North American Occupational Safety and Health (NAOSH) week is held every year during the first full week of May to raise awareness about occupational safety, health and the environment (OSH&E) in an effort to prevent workplace injuries and illnesses. The American Society of Safety Engineers (ASSE) partners with the Canadian Society of Safety Engineering (CSSE) to raise public awareness about safety in the workplace in North America during NAOSH week.

This is one of the major tools that ASSE and its 34,000 OSH&E professional members use throughout the year to increase attention to the importance of keeping all employees injury and illness free in the workplace. Several organizations and government agencies partner with ASSE to support NAOSH Week, including the Department of Labor’s Occupational Safety and Health Administration (OSHA) and their alliance partners.

ASSE members host various classes, symposiums and work safety fairs, and distribute information on such subjects as catastrophe preparedness, roadway crash prevention and teen worker safety. In addition, ASSE assists charities, provides teen worker safety programs, and donates personal protective equipment (PPE) as part of NAOSH Week.

During the months leading up to NAOSH Week, ASSE holds its popular children's "safety-on-the-job" poster contest (ages 5–14) which supports Society members, and educates children on the importance of workplace safety. The contest runs annually from September 19 through February 14.

Each year provinces and states, cities and counties support NAOSH week and local ASSE members by sponsoring and passing proclamations and resolutions in support of occupational SH&E practitioners who work to prevent accidents, injuries and occupational diseases, create safer work and leisure environments and develop safer products. 

ASSE honors its members who have gone above and beyond in supporting NAOSH week and the profession with the annual ASSE North American Occupational Safety and Health (NAOSH) Week Champion. The awards are presented each year at the ASSE Professional Development Conference.

External links
 Official website

Occupational safety and health
Awareness weeks in Canada
Awareness weeks in the United States
May observances